This is a list of electoral systems by country in alphabetical order. An electoral system is used to elect national legislatures and heads of state.

Maps
{|class=wikitable
!Head of state
!Lower (or unicameral) house
!Upper house
|-
|
|
|
|-
|colspan=3|
{|style="font-size:90%;"
|-
|width=33% valign="top"|
Single-winner system / single-member constituencies (non-proportional)

Multi-member constituencies, majoritarian (non-proportional)

Multi-member constituencies, semi-proportional

Multi-member constituencies, proportional

|width=34% valign="top"|

Mixed non-compensatory (semi-proportional)

 (MBS)Mixed compensatory (proportional or semi-proportional)|width=33% valign="top"|Indirect electionOther|}
|}

 Electoral systems by country 

 Key Type of systemtype of representation: single winner (single office, e.g. FPTP, TRS), majoritarian (body elected in winner-take-all districts e.g. FPTP, TRS, block voting), proportional (body elected by STV/party-list PR), mixed (combination of majoritarian+proportional), semi-proportional (e.g. SNTV, LV), indirect (by legislature(s) and/or electoral college), no election''' (chosen by a single person, or other rules e.g. hereditary)
 Seats per district Most elections are split into a number of electoral districts.  In some elections, there is one person elected per district. In others, there are many people elected per district.  Electoral districts can have different names, see list of electoral districts by nation.
 Total number of seats the number of representatives elected to the body in total.
 Electoral threshold see Electoral threshold

See also 
 List of countries
 Electoral system

Notes

References 

Much of the data on Bulgaria from Central electoral committee - "Methods for determining the number of mandates in constituencies and the results of the vote" (in Bulgarian); A mathematical analysis of the system

Much of the data regarding which voting system is used is drawn from this 2002 report from the International Institute for Democracy and Electoral Assistance (IDEA).

Much of the data regarding the size of the parliaments comes from this 1997 report from the same Institute.

Some of the data has been updated since then.

External links 
ACE Electoral Knowledge Network Expert site providing encyclopedia on Electoral Systems and Management, country by country data, a library of electoral materials, latest election news, the opportunity to submit questions to a network of electoral experts, and a forum to discuss all of the above.
A Handbook of Electoral System Design from International IDEA
Electoral Design Reference Materials from the ACE Project
PARLINE database from the Inter-Parliamentary Union
Political Database of the Americas - Georgetown University
Project for Global Democracy and Human Rights This page links to a table and a world map that is color-coded by the primary electoral system used by each country.

Voting systems

Electoral systems by country